Gillian Pinder (born 5 May 1992) is an Ireland women's field hockey international. She was a member of the Ireland team that played in the 2018 Women's Hockey World Cup final. Pinder has also won Irish Senior Cup and Women's Irish Hockey League titles with UCD.

Early years, family and education
Pinder is the daughter of Alan and Mary Pinder. Her father, Alan, is originally from Mullingar.
Her sister, Laura, is also a field hockey player and has played for Hermes-Monkstown in the Women's Irish Hockey League and the EuroHockey Club Champions Cup . Pinder was educated at St. Andrew's College, Syracuse University and University College Dublin. She graduated from UCD with a Bachelor of Business and Law.

Club career

St. Andrew's College
Pinder played field hockey for St. Andrew's College in a team that also included her sister, Laura and Chloe Watkins. She played in three Leinster Schoolgirls' Senior Cup finals, regularly playing against teams that included future Ireland teammates. In the 2007 final, Pinder and Watkins lost 5–0 to an Alexandra College team that featured Nicola Evans. In the 2009 final St. Andrew's faced Loreto, Beaufort and Hannah Matthews. This time St. Andrew's won 2–0 after extra time. In the 2010 final Pinder scored the opening goal in a 2–0 win. Watkins captained St. Andrew's as they defeated an Alexandra College team that featured Deirdre Duke and Emily Beatty. In 2010 Pinder and Watkins were also members of the St. Andrew's College team that won the Kate Russell All-Ireland Schoolgirls Championship, defeating Coláiste Iognáid, Galway 3–1 in the final. On 10 September 2018, after their success at the Women's Hockey World Cup,  Watkins and Pinder returned to St. Andrew's to share their experience with the current students at St. Andrew's. Pinder also began managing the hockey programme at St. Andrew's.

Hermes
In 2008–09 Pinder together with Nicola Evans, Anna O'Flanagan and Chloe Watkins, was a member of the Hermes team that were runners up in the inaugural Women's Irish Hockey League season. Pinder also played for Hermes in the 2010–11 Irish Senior Cup final as Hermes lost 3–1 to Pegasus. Her teammates on this occasion included her sister, Laura, Deirdre Duke and Anna O'Flanagan. In 2012, along with Mary Goode and Audrey O'Flynn, Pinder was a member of the Hermes team that won the Women's EuroHockey Club Champion's Challenge I, defeating Lille Metropole 3–1 in the final.

Syracuse Orange
In 2012 Pinder attended Syracuse University on a hockey scholarship. She subsequently helped Syracuse Orange win the 2012 Big East Regular Season. She also helped Syracuse reach the 2012 NCAA Division I Field Hockey Championship semi-finals. At Syracuse, together with Emma Russell and Liz McInerney, Pinder formed a forward line that featured three future Ireland internationals.

UCD
Pinder started playing for UCD in 2013. She subsequently scored for UCD on her Women's Irish Hockey League debut against her former team, Hermes. In 2013–14, together with Nicola Evans, Anna O'Flanagan, Katie Mullan, Emily Beatty and Deirdre Duke she was a member of the UCD team that defeated Pembroke Wanderers 2–0 in the Irish Senior Cup final. In the same season she helped UCD win their first Women's Irish Hockey League title. Pinder also played for UCD in the 2015 EuroHockey Club Champions Cup. In 2016–17 she won a second Irish Senior Cup with UCD when, together with Elena Tice, Katie Mullan and Deirdre Duke, she was a member of the UCD team that defeated Cork Harlequins 1–0 in the final. 
The 2016–17 season also saw Pinder help UCD win their second Women's Irish Hockey League title. UCD and Pinder subsequently completed a national treble when they also won the EY Champions Trophy after defeating Hermes-Monkstown in a penalty shoot-out.

Pembroke Wanderers
The 2017–18 season saw Pinder play for Pembroke Wanderers in the Women's Irish Hockey League. Her teammates at Wanderers included Emily Beatty.

Ireland international
Pinder represented Ireland at Under-16, Under-18 and Under-21 levels before making her senior debut. She made her senior international debut on 24 April 2011 against France. In March 2015 Pinder was a member of the Ireland team that won a 2014–15 Women's FIH Hockey World League Round 2 tournament hosted in Dublin, defeating Canada in the final after a penalty shoot-out. She was also a member of the Ireland team that won the 2015 Women's EuroHockey Championship II, defeating the Czech Republic 5–0 in the final. In January 2017 she was also a member of the Ireland team that won a 2016–17 Women's FIH Hockey World League Round 2 tournament in Kuala Lumpur, defeating Malaysia 3–0 in the final. On 12 July 2017 in the 2016–17 Women's FIH Hockey World League Semifinals she scored a "thunderbolt" of a goal against Poland, which was described as one of the highlights of Ireland's 2018 Women's Hockey World Cup qualification campaign.

Pinder represented Ireland at the 2018 Women's Hockey World Cup and was a prominent member of the team that won the silver medal. She featured in all of Ireland's games throughout the tournament, including the pool games against the United States, India, and England, the quarter-final against India, the semi-final against Spain and the final against the Netherlands. In the semi-final against Spain, Pinder scored twice in the penalty shoot-out. After successfully converting the sudden death penalty, she sent Ireland through to the final.

Occupation
Together with Lizzie Colvin, Nicola Evans, Anna O'Flanagan and Deirdre Duke,  Pinder  was one of five lawyers in the Ireland squad at the 2018 Women's Hockey World Cup.

Honours
Ireland
Women's Hockey World Cup
Runners Up: 2018
Women's FIH Hockey World League
Winners: 2015 Dublin, 2017 Kuala Lumpur
Women's EuroHockey Championship II
Winners: 2015
Women's Hockey Champions Challenge I
Runners Up: 2014
Women's FIH Hockey Series
Runners Up: 2019 Banbridge
Women's Four Nations Cup
Runners Up: 2017
UCD
Women's Irish Hockey League
Winners: 2013–14, 2016–17: 2 
Irish Senior Cup
Winners: 2013–14, 2016–17: 2 
EY Champions Trophy
Winners: 2017
Syracuse Orange
Big East Regular Season
Winners: 2012
Hermes
Women's Irish Hockey League
Runners Up: 2008–09, 2010–11
Irish Senior Cup
Runners Up: 2010–11
Women's EuroHockey Club Champion's Challenge I
Winners: 2012
St. Andrew's College
Leinster Schoolgirls' Senior Cup
Winners: 2008–09, 2009–10
Runners Up: 2006–07
Kate Russell All-Ireland Schoolgirls Championships
Winners: 2010

References

External links
 

1992 births
Living people
Irish female field hockey players
Ireland international women's field hockey players
Place of birth missing (living people)
Female field hockey midfielders
Women's Irish Hockey League players
UCD Ladies' Hockey Club players
Pembroke Wanderers Hockey Club players
Syracuse Orange field hockey players
Irish field hockey coaches
People educated at St Andrew's College, Dublin
Alumni of University College Dublin
Expatriate field hockey players
Irish expatriate sportspeople in the United States
Irish women lawyers
21st-century Irish lawyers
Sportspeople from Dún Laoghaire–Rathdown
Field hockey players from County Dublin
21st-century women lawyers